Badcock is a surname of English origin, properly 'Bartcock', or son of Bartholemew. In his history of the Badcock family, published in "Miscellanea Genealogica et Heraldica, London, 1927" Colonel J.C Tyler writes of his research into the Badcock name: "One cannot fail to be struck with the great number of priests, parsons and men of literary repute. There are also in evidence merchants both by sea and by land, also landowners, soldiers and sailors, besides those engaged in the principal industry of weaving in Devon and Somerset, which includes the woolcombers, sergemakers and men of similar crafts".

Notable persons with this surname have included:

 General Sir Alexander Robert Badcock, KCB, CSI (1844–1907), British general in the Indian Army
 Henry Stanhope Badcock, founder of Badcock Home Furniture
 Jack Clement Badcock (20th century), English naturalist, historian, columnist, writer and painter
 Jack Badcock (1914–1982), Australian cricketer
 John Badcock (writer) (fl. 1816–1830), English sporting writer
 John Badcock (cricketer) (1883–1940), English cricketer
 John Badcock (artist) (born 1952), New Zealand artist
 John Badcock (rower) (1903–1976), British rower
 Lovell Badcock (1744–1797), High Sheriff of Buckinghamshire
 General Sir Lovell Benjamin Lovell (Badcock) (1786–1861), British lieutenant-general
 Peter Badcock (1934–1967), Australian recipient of the Victoria Cross
 Richard Neale Badcock (1721–1783), English merchant and a director of the South Sea Company
 Samuel Badcock (1747–1788), English theologian and literary critic
 Ted Badcock (1897–1982), New Zealand Test cricketer
 Thomas Stanhope Badcock (1749–1821), High Sheriff of Buckinghamshire
 William Badcock (1622–1698), London goldsmith, hilt-maker and author
 Vice Admiral William Stanhope Lovell (Badcock) (1788–1859), British vice-admiral and veteran of Trafalgar

See also

 Badcock Home Furniture

References

English-language surnames